SWII may refer to:

 Ipiranga Airport (IATA airport code: IPG; ICAO airport code: SWII) Santo Antônio do Içá, Brazil
 Secret Wars II (adventure), 1986 role playing game from TSR based on Marvel Comics
 Star Wars: Episode II – Attack of the Clones (2002 film)

See also
 SW2 (disambiguation)